Camberwell Community Centre is located, on 33/35 Fairholm Grove, Camberwell, Melbourne, VIC 3124, Australia.

The NEW Camberwell Community Centre offers courses that support and enhance connection through creativity, learning and wellbeing. Programs and activities range from multi-cultural senior groups, social cards and games, film and book clubs as well as art, ceramics and languages. Room and Hall hire is also available.

References

See also
List of Town Halls in Melbourne

Town halls in Melbourne
Victorian architecture in Victoria (Australia)
Second Empire architecture in Australia
1891 establishments in Australia
Buildings and structures in the City of Boroondara
Clock towers in Australia
Government buildings completed in 1891